Maegan Cottone is an American songwriter, singer, vocal producer and vocal arranger. In 2012, Cottone signed to British publishing company Phrased Differently and managed by Wide Awake Music. She achieved international songwriting success in the US, France, UK, Germany, Denmark, Sweden and the Netherlands. Four of her songs have been top ten singles in the UK.

She is best known for her work on Little Mix's "Confetti" (#1 UK) and "Move", Jax Jones' "This is Real", Sigala's "Wish You Well", Olly Murs' "Up".

Early life 
Inspired by her mother's vinyl collection of Tamla Motown hits, Queen and Stevie Wonder songs, she began composing and writing at the piano from an early age. Maegan studied piano and classical voice after moving to London with her mother and sister from America at the age of nine.

Musical career 
Cottone has written three UK top ten singles: "Up" (No. 4 -Gold) for Olly Murs, "Move" (No. 3 -Gold) and "Salute" (No. 6 -Silver) for Little Mix. She also scored a Korean (No. 2) with "Red Light" for Kpop girl group f(x); and a Danish (No. 2 - double platinum) with "R.E.D." for Kongsted. 
In 2014, Cottone arranged and vocal produced a cover of Cameo's "Word Up!" (produced by TMS), the official Sport Relief Single of 2014. The song features vocals from Little Mix, who Cottone has worked with several times - including appointments as vocal director and musical director of the group's Radio 1 Live Lounge, and vocal director on their Salute Tour. 
Cottone also wrote the song "The Humblest Start" for the Street Dance 3D soundtrack. Performed by LP & JC, her vocals are also featured.

Cottone has worked with artists and producers worldwide such as DJ Mustard, Babyface, Chase & Status, TMS, Cutfather, White N3rd, Melissa Steel, Tamera Foster, Shea Taylor, Tara McDonald, Wayne Wilkins, Red Triangle and Komi.

Songwriting credits

See also 
 "Word Up!" Little Mix cover 
 "Red Light" by f(x)
 "Salute" album credits

References

External links 
 Phrased Differently

Living people
American women songwriters
Songwriters from Virginia
Year of birth missing (living people)
21st-century American women